Diamond Elementary School may refer to:

 Diamond Elementary School, in the Santa Ana Unified School District elementary schools, in Santa Ana, California
 Diamond Elementary School, a public elementary school in Liberty County, Georgia, in Fort Stewart, Georgia
 Diamond Elementary School, a public elementary school in Montgomery County, Maryland, in Gaithersburg, Maryland